The Taylor J.T.1 Monoplane is a British fixed-wing aircraft design for a homebuilt aircraft, developed in the 1950s by J.F. Taylor.

History
The J.T.1 Monoplane was designed by John Taylor in 1956 and the prototype (registered G-APRT) was built by him at Ilford, Essex between 1958-1959. It flew for the first time on 4 July 1959  at White Waltham. At that time it represented the first post war homebuilt design to come from England.

Construction
It was designed to be constructed in small spaces with the minimum of tools and material cost, requiring only average building skills from the constructor. It is aimed exclusively at the lower power range such as the  Volkswagen air-cooled engine, therefore giving economy with an acceptable cruise speed. It is semi- aerobatic.

Operation

The airframe of the J.T.1 Monoplane was proof loaded to verify the stress calculations and no modification has ever been introduced since the prototype was approved. The total number flying to date is over 110 examples.

As a result of a request for an aircraft with higher performance than the Taylor Monoplane, Taylor designed a high performance single-seater, the Taylor Titch. Taylor built the prototype, registered G-ATYO, at Leigh-on-Sea, Essex between 1965 and 1966; the Titch first flew at Southend Airport on 4 January 1967.

Specifications

See also

References

Notes

Bibliography

 Bayerl, Robby, Martin Berkemeier et al. World Directory of Leisure Aviation 2011–12. Lancaster UK: WDLA UK, 2011. .
 Jackson, A.J. British Civil Aircraft since 1919, Volume 3. London: Putnam, 1974. .
 Purdy, Don: AeroCrafter: Homebuilt Aircraft Sourcebook, Fifth Edition. Benicia, California: BAI Communications, 1998. .
 Taylor, John W. R., ed. Jane's All The World's Aircraft 1982–83. London: Jane's Yearbooks, 1982. .
 Taylor, John W. R., ed. Jane's All the World's Aircraft 1988–1989. Coulsdon, Surrey, UK: Jane's Information Group, 1988. .

External links

Taylortitch.co.uk

1950s British civil utility aircraft
Homebuilt aircraft
Aircraft first flown in 1959
Low-wing aircraft